Stoke is a suburb of Ipswich, in the Ipswich district, in the county of Suffolk, England. Stoke was placed in the hundred of Ipswich in 1086 in the Domesday Book as one of 470 places under the control of the Abbey of Ely St Etheldreda.

Amenities 
Stoke has a primary school and a post office, a co-op, a small superstore, Stoke High School, a library and 3 places of worship (one of which is a Grade I listed Anglican church called Saint Mary at Stoke).

Location grid

See also 
 Stoke Bridge

References 

 Philip's Street Atlas Suffolk (page 139)

Ipswich Districts